The Librarians is an American fantasy-adventure television series developed by John Rogers and broadcast on TNT. It premiered on December 7, 2014, as a direct spin-off of the Librarian film series, sharing continuity with the films. The Librarians are an ancient organization dedicated to protecting an innocent world from a magical and fantasy-like secret reality hidden from view. TNT cancelled the series in March 2018.

Plot 
The series follows four people newly recruited by The Library: Colonel Eve Baird (Rebecca Romijn), of the NATO Anti-Terrorist Unit, destined to be the new Guardian;  Ezekiel Jones (John Harlan Kim), a consummate thief who can hack an NSA computer as easily as he can steal a Fabergé egg; Cassandra Cillian (Lindy Booth), a brilliant scientist and mathematician who possesses a trace of magic; and Jacob Stone (Christian Kane), polymath, linguist, expert in architecture, art, art history, archaeology and world cultures of the past and present, including Native American cultures, and other fields too numerous to mention, including bar fighting. The latter three received invitations from the Library at the same time as the current Librarian, Flynn Carsen (Noah Wyle), but for various reasons didn't show up for their interviews. Their lives are threatened in the first episode in the series. At the end of the second episode the Library reissues their invitations. 

In a break with the concept established in the films that there can be only one Librarian at a time, the first episodes reveal that the state of the world is so dire that it needs a team of Librarians, with Baird serving as Guardian of all four. With the help of Jenkins/Galahad (John Larroquette), immortal manager of the Library’s Annex, they solve impossible mysteries, rewrite and fix key moments in history, recover powerful magical artifacts, fight against supernatural threats, and learn important things about themselves and each other. In the first season, they battle the forces of the Serpent Brotherhood, led by the mysterious immortal Dulaque (Matt Frewer). Carsen, who spends the first season searching for the main Library (removed from time and space at the beginning of the series) appears in some episodes.

The second season offers up a pair of new villains, both from fiction: Prospero (Richard Cox), from Shakespeare's The Tempest, and Moriarty (David S. Lee), Sherlock Holmes' chief nemesis. The former is positioned as the greater evil, attempting to use magic to destroy the world in order to remake it more to his liking. Moriarty is more of a gray villain—generally aligned with Prospero but willing to side with the Librarians when it suits his own interests. 

The third season introduces a new adversary, Apep, the Egyptian God of Chaos. Defeated centuries before by the first Librarian, Judson (Bob Newhart), and his Guardian, Charlene (Jane Curtin), he is resurrected when his sarcophagus is opened and embarks on a mission to release pure evil into the world, possessing many different people along the way. While they are trying to stop Apep, the Librarians' actions are closely monitored by General Cynthia Rockwell (Vanessa Williams) from a new secret government agency, called DOSA (Department of Statistical Anomalies).

The fourth season does away with season-long story arcs in favor of stand-alone episodes, with three ongoing issues: Before the vernal equinox, Flynn and Eve must undertake a ceremony that will bind them to each other and to the Library, as Charlene and Judson did before them. They will become immortal and bind the Library to Earth, giving it a human connection and a human heart rather than the cold, implacable and dangerously self-centered attitude that would characterize it without that bond. (We learn in season three that the Library is a conscious entity.) The return of Nicole Noone, Flynn's first Guardian, believed dead and now immortal, raises many questions. And conflict arises between the Librarians over former Librarian Darrington Dare's assertion that there can only be one Librarian at a time, or the result will be disastrous. These three stories are not resolved until the last episode.

Episodes 

On February 12, 2015, TNT renewed the series for a 10-episode second season, which aired from November 1 to December 27, 2015. On December 15, 2015, TNT renewed the series for a 10-episode third season, which aired from November 20, 2016 to January 22, 2017. On January 24, 2017, TNT renewed the series for a fourth season, which premiered on December 13, 2017.

Cast

Main 
 Rebecca Romijn as Colonel Eve Baird, a former NATO agent whom the Library chose as the "Guardian", tasked with protecting and training the new Librarians and protecting Flynn. In "And Santa's Midnight Run", it's revealed that she was born on Christmas Eve, and her parents named her accordingly. She and Flynn are attracted to each other almost immediately. 
 Christian Kane as Jacob Stone, an Oklahoma oil-rigger and genius with an IQ of 190 and an extensive knowledge of languages, archaeology, Native-American culture, art history, conservation, architecture, and more. Fearing disapproval from his family, he has hidden his talents from them, publishing under several pseudonyms and winning worldwide recognition for his expertise. While he initially does not trust Cassandra after her betrayal in "And The Crown of King Arthur", he eventually accepts her as a valued member of the team.
 Lindy Booth as Cassandra Cillian, a mathematician who has uncontrollable auditory and sensory hallucinations linked to memory retrieval, as well as a rare condition called synesthesia. She has a brain tumor, diagnosed in childhood, which causes pain if she thinks hard enough. Because of the extreme pain, Stone teaches her to connect to a peaceful memory during her thoughts. Since her teens, she has been living with the knowledge that this tumor will kill her, unless she risks an extremely dangerous surgery that may take her life and, if she survives, will probably destroy her gift. In season 3, facing death, she has the surgery. The tumor is successfully removed, and she finds her mental abilities are tremendously enhanced, as is her connection with magic.
 John Harlan Kim as Ezekiel Jones, an Australian thief and "master of technologies" he has hacked the London Police's security network, NSA, and numerous other law enforcement agencies. He prefers to rely on his luck and wit, not showing much concern for others until he gets to a point of realizing something important about the current case. In season 3 he reveals to his foster mother—but to no one else—that he does not keep his ill-gotten gains, but uses them to support charities and to help the helpless. He believes that this is why the Library invited him.
 John Larroquette as Jenkins (Galeas/Galahad), the Annex's reluctant, sometimes cantankerous caretaker; he has worked there "for longer than anyone knows" and has extensive knowledge of ancient lore. He is also seen to have a connection to Dulaque, as revealed in "And the Apple of Discord". It is later explained that they are both immortal because of a spell Dulaque cast 1,000 years earlier after the fall of Camelot. He was known during King Arthur's reign as Sir Galahad, as revealed in "And the Loom of Fate". He has also known Morgan le Fay (Alicia Witt) for centuries and considers her to be his archenemy, as he blames her for Arthur's death. In season 4, in “Some Dude Named Jeff,” he confirms that he is the illegitimate son of Lancelot du Lac.

Recurring 
 Noah Wyle as Flynn Carsen, Librarian for the past 10 years, who periodically works alongside the team. Flynn has not retired. The Library has called three additional Librarians to share the burden. Flynn has worked without a Guardian for almost a decade. The Library recruited Colonel Eve Baird to be the new Guardian. At the end of season four, he and Eve became the new immortal tethers for The Library after the previous tethers, Judson and Charlene, passed on to the void.
 Matt Frewer as Dulaque, the mysterious immortal leader of the Serpent Brotherhood, who has a past relationship with Jenkins. He was known during King Arthur's reign as Sir Lancelot du Lac, as revealed in "And The Loom of Fate", and has devoted himself to reversing the events that brought about the fall of Camelot. In the same episode, he is briefly restored to his younger self (Jerry O'Connell), only to be erased from existence by Flynn.
 Lesley-Ann Brandt as Lamia, Dulaque's second-in-command in the Serpent Brotherhood, who serves him faithfully until he betrays and kills her in "And The Loom of Fate". Her name is a reference to the mythical Libyan queen of the same name. 
 Jane Curtin as Charlene, the Library’s humorless administrator, who interviewed Flynn for the job of the Librarian. In the final season, it is revealed that she was the first Guardian and that she is immortal. She and Judson performed the tethering ceremony that is one of the season 4 story arcs.
 Bob Newhart as Judson, the first Librarian, who now acts as a mentor to those who take up the mantle. In the third season, it is revealed that he founded the Library in Alexandria during the time of Ancient Egypt after defeating Apep.
 Richard Cox as Prospero, the fictional protagonist of The Tempest, who comes to life seeking to regain his sorcery and conquer the world. During the finale of the second season, ("And The Final Curtain"), he merges with Shakespeare himself, only to be banished back to his original story by the Librarians.
 David S. Lee as Professor Moriarty, the archenemy of Sherlock Holmes, who is summoned by Prospero to assist him. He is eventually returned to his story by Prospero after betraying him in "And The Final Curtain".
 Hayley McLaughlin as Ariel, a real fairy (as opposed to a fictional) who was accidentally written into The Tempest by Shakespeare. She serves Prospero, using her powers to assist him and his followers. In "And The Happily Ever Afters", she manages to disguise herself as a human and contacts Flynn, helping him break her master's control over the other Librarians in exchange for her freedom.
 Beth Riesgraf as the Lady of the Lake, an enigmatic figure that acts as the spokesperson for an intellectual collective that truly comprehends the scientific constructs behind magic and who takes an interest in Cassandra due to her unique abilities. In "And The Final Curtain", she helps Flynn and Eve defeat Prospero in the past by providing them with Arthur's sword, Excalibur.
 Rachel Nichols as Nicole Noone, Flynn's first Guardian (portrayed in the first movie, The Librarian: Quest for the Spear, by Sonya Walger). Flynn thought that she had died, and he is shattered to find her alive, and immortal, in the present. Thrust 500 years into the past, she used magic to prolong her life and spent the next 5 centuries planning what to do when she saw Flynn again.

Production 

TNT ordered a ten-episode weekly series version of The Librarians, following the original cast that includes Noah Wyle, Bob Newhart, and Jane Curtin, as well as five new characters who work for The Library. The series films in Portland, Oregon. Some scenes were filmed at the Oregon State Capitol in Salem. A teaser trailer aired right after the Falling Skies season finale.

On March 8, 2018, Dean Devlin announced that TNT had cancelled the series and that he was in the process of shopping the series to other networks; however, in June, Devlin announced that negotiations were unsuccessful.

Broadcast 
The series premiered in over 100 countries on Universal Channel within 24 hours of its premiere in the United States. In Canada, the series premiered December 7, 2014, on Space. In the United Kingdom, the series was originally set to premiere on Universal Channel, however, it was announced it would instead air on Syfy, premiering December 8, 2014. In Australia, the series premiered on Universal Channel on December 9, 2014, and returned for season 2 on November 5, 2015. The series premiered in New Zealand on The Zone on February 17, 2015.

Home media 

In Australia, Region 4, the entire series has been released on DVD individually and as a complete series box set.

The Complete First Season — 13 May 2015
The Complete Second Season — 23 March 2016
The Complete Third Season — 15 March 2017
The Complete Fourth Season — 18 April 2018
The Complete Series — 6 March 2019

Syndication 
The first two episodes also appeared as a feature film on December 12, 2014 on The CW. The show was acquired by UPtv and premiered on March 13, 2019. The show moved to Ovation in 2019.

Novels 
Three tie-in novels have been published, all written by Greg Cox: The Librarians and the Lost Lamp (2016) follows the characters of the television series as they attempt to find Aladdin's lamp, in both the past and the future.  In The Librarians and the Mother Goose Chase (2017)  the characters attempt to find various sections of the original Mother Goose story book before a descendant of the original Mother Goose is able to recombine the parts and use its power. In The Librarians and the Pot of Gold (2019), the Serpent Brotherhood have returned, and the Librarians learn the truth behind the story of St. Patrick driving the “snakes” out of Éire, with the help of a Librarian.

Critical reception 
The Librarians scored 63 out of 100 on Metacritic based on 11 "generally favorable" reviews. The review aggregator website Rotten Tomatoes reported a 70% critics rating with an average rating of 6.7 out of 10 based on 14 reviews. The website consensus reads: "It's familiar stuff, but The Librarians offers family-friendly fun with a mixture of silliness and adventure".

Accolades

References

External links 
 

The Librarian (franchise)
2014 American television series debuts
2018 American television series endings
American action television series
American adventure television series
Treasure hunt television series
English-language television shows
Television series about parallel universes
TNT (American TV network) original programming
Television shows set in Oregon
Television shows filmed in Oregon
Television shows set in Portland, Oregon
American fantasy television series
American action adventure television series